Payena longipedicellata is a tree in the family Sapotaceae. The bark is black. Inflorescences bear up to three flowers. The specific epithet  is from the Latin meaning "long pedicel", referring to the flower. Habitat is lowland mixed dipterocarp forests. P. longipedicellata is found in Peninsular Malaysia and Borneo.

References

longipedicellata
Trees of Peninsular Malaysia
Trees of Borneo
Plants described in 1906